Postville (formerly known as Stewart) is an unincorporated community located in the town of York, Green County, Wisconsin, United States.

Notable people
Hiram Gabriel, Wisconsin State Assemblyman and farmer, lived in Stewart; Gabriel served as the chairman of the York Town Board.

Notes

Unincorporated communities in Green County, Wisconsin
Unincorporated communities in Wisconsin